Harney (Monocacyville as late as 1892) is an unincorporated community in Carroll County, Maryland, United States. Harney is also the home of the 'World's Best Carnival'. It has been the home of the Harney Volunteer Fire Company since 1951.

Geography
Harney is located near the head of the Monocacy River to the northwest and is the site of the following crossroads: east/west Conover Road (named for a family who owned a defunct farm on the east of the town) and north/south Harney Road. Additional intersections at the ball field are Bowers Road, off Conover Road, and Baptist Road heads southwest from just south of the crossroads. Communities near Harney are Longville to the south, Emmitsburg (southwest) and in Pennsylvania, Natural Dam (west), Mt. Joy Township (north - just across the state line on 134), Barlow 3.1 mi north, Two Taverns (north-northeast), Littlestown (east-northeast), and Kingsdale (east).

References
* Other Myers Mills were at the 1863 Marsh Creek site depicted on Chapel Road by a Confederate cartographer,  the 1919 Myers Mill that burned at Arendtsville, Pennsylvania, and "Mairs Mill" west of Harney.

** The Reaser Hose camp and adjoining "Good Samaritan Masonic Camp" were northwest of Harney at S. D. Reck's woods/dam on Rock Creek near the Monocacy where there was a 1935 grove, clubhouse, and baseball field.)  The "Black Hole" "near Harney" was an additional recreation area in 1926.

References

1824 establishments in Maryland
1897 establishments in Maryland
American Civil War sites in Maryland
Maryland in the American Civil War
Populated places established in 1824
Unincorporated communities in Carroll County, Maryland
Unincorporated communities in Maryland